Rzepedź  (Reped’) is a village in the administrative district of Gmina Komańcza, within Sanok County, in the Subcarpathian Voivodeship (province) of south-eastern Poland, close to the border with Slovakia.

The village has a population of 1,400.

See also
Komancza Republic (November 1918 – January 1919)

References

Villages in Sanok County